The Charleston Southern Railway was a South Carolina railroad established in the early part of the 20th century.

The Charleston Southern Railway, incorporated by the South Carolina General Assembly in 1915, was to be an extension of the Seaboard Air Line Railroad, with an 85-mile route from Charleston, South Carolina, to Savannah, Georgia, planned.

The Charleston Southern merged with the Carolina, Atlantic and Western Railway in September 1915.

Two months later, the Carolina, Atlantic and Western changed its name to the Seaboard Air Line Railroad.

References

Defunct South Carolina railroads
Railway companies established in 1915
Railway companies disestablished in 1915
Predecessors of the Seaboard Air Line Railroad
American companies established in 1915
1915 establishments in South Carolina
1915 disestablishments in South Carolina